The white-striped cape skink or barred shark skink (Eugongylus albofasciolatus) is a species of lizard in the family Scincidae. It is found in Australia (Queensland), the Solomon Islands, New Britain, New Ireland, and Micronesia.

References

Eugongylus
Reptiles described in 1872
Taxa named by Albert Günther